These are the nineteen episodes that were produced for the Legend of Light anime series. The titles for the episode differ from version to version. For example: in the French version the title of the first episode is "Cynthia" which is the name given to Hikari in the French version, but when it comes to the Italian version the name of the first episode is "La speranza della ginnastica ritmica" (The hope of rhythmic gymnastics).

Episode list

References 

Hikari no Densetsu